A help desk is a department or person that provides assistance and information, usually for electronic or computer problems. In the mid-1990s, research by Iain Middleton of Robert Gordon University studied the value of an organization's help desks. It found that value was derived not only from a reactive response to user issues, but also from the help desk's unique position of communicating daily with numerous customers or employees. Information gained in areas such as technical problems, user preferences, and satisfaction can be valuable for the planning and development work of other information technology units.

Large help desks have a person or team responsible for managing the incoming requests, called "issues"; they are commonly called queue managers or queue supervisors. The queue manager is responsible for the issue queues, which can be set up in various ways depending on the help desk size or structure. Typically, large help desks have several teams that are experienced in working on different issues. The queue manager will assign an issue to one of the specialized teams based on the type of issue raised. Some help desks may have telephone systems with ACD splits ensuring that calls about specific topics are put through to analysts with the requisite experience or knowledge.

See also
Call center
Customer service
Comparison of issue-tracking systems
Comparison of help desk issue tracking software 
Technical support
Help desk software

References

 
Computer telephony integration
Customer service 
Outsourcing 
Telephony